Anand Goradia is an Indian television actor and writer. He is known for his roles in ROAR: Tigers of the Sundarbans (2014), Sanskaar Laxmi (2011) and Adaalat (2010). He played the role of Bundi ruler Rao Surtan Singh in Bharat Ka Veer Putra – Maharana Pratap.

He received his college degree from Parag Vijay Dutt Drama Academy, Mumbai as an acting major. His first acting debut was in Zee TV's show Commando.

He has acted in noted TV series like Na Aana Is Des Laado and Maayke Se Bandhi Dor.

Television
Shrimaan Shrimati (one episode) 
Aahat (1996-97) (six episodes)
Gudgudee (1998) (one episode)
Jamai Raja (1999)    
Bhabhi (2003) as Tanakesh
Kayaamat (2003–2004) as Yashwant (Babu)                            
Maniben.com (2009–2010) as Rishi
Na Aana Is Des Laado (2011) as Gajender Sangwan
Hasratein  (1996) as Bittu Khanna                                                     
Maayke Se Bandhi Dor (2011) as Prabhu                                   
Fear Files as Jayant (2013)
Chakravartin Ashoka Samrat (2015) as Agnibahu                                             
Adaalat as Advocate Inder Mohan Jaiswal / Yash Mohan Jaiswal                                       
Bharat Ka Veer Putra – Maharana Pratap (2013–2014) as Rao Surtan Singh 
 Devon Ke Dev...Mahadev (2014) as Pushpadanta
Bhanwar (2015)CID (2016) (for one episode) Yeh Moh Moh Ke Dhaagey (2017)Tenali Rama as Ghungru (2017)Shakti - Astitva Ke Ehsaas Ki (2017–2019) as MaharaniVighnaharta Ganesha (2017–2021) as Narad MuniDastaan-E-Mohabbat Salim Anarkali'' (2018–2019) as Khanam Khwazariya

References

External links
 

21st-century Indian male actors
Indian male film actors
Indian male models
Indian male television actors
Living people
Male actors from Mumbai
Indian television writers
Male television writers
Year of birth missing (living people)